Hirao (written: 平尾) is a Japanese surname. Notable people with the surname include:

, Japanese women's footballer
, Japanese baseball player
, Japanese rugby union player and coach
, Japanese footballer
, Japanese anime director

Japanese-language surnames